is a railway station in the city of Akita, Akita Prefecture, Japan, operated by East Japan Railway Company (JR East).

Lines

Station layout
The station has  two opposed side platforms, connected to the station building by a footbridge. The station is staffed.  Akita Shinkansen trains run through this station, using the tracks adjacent to Platform 1.

Platforms

History
Wada Station opened on October 1, 1903 as a station on the Japanese Government Railways (JGR). The station was absorbed into the JR East network upon the privatization of JNR on April 1, 1987. A new station building was completed in February 2003.

Passenger statistics
In fiscal 2018, the station was used by an average of 331 passengers daily (boarding passengers only).

Surrounding area
 
 Former Kawabe Town Hall
 Wada Post Office
 Akita International University

See also
List of railway stations in Japan

References

External links

  JR East station information 

Railway stations in Akita Prefecture
Ōu Main Line
Railway stations in Japan opened in 1903
Buildings and structures in Akita (city)